The Tata family is  an Indian business family, based in Mumbai, India. The parent company is Tata Sons, which is the main holding company of the Tata Group. About 65% of the stock in these companies is owned by various Tata family charitable trusts, mainly the Ratan Tata Trust and the Dorab Tata Trust. Approximately 18% of the shares are held by the Pallonji Mistry family, and the rest by various Tata sons.

The Tatas are a Parsi family and originally came to Mumbai from Surat in the state of Gujarat. The founder of the family's fortune was Jamshetji Tata. The Tata family is related to the Petit baronets through Sylla Tata, who married Sir Dinshaw Maneckji Petit, 3rd Baronet.

Prominent members
 Jamshedji  Tata (3 March 1839 – 19 May 1904), known as one of the fathers of Indian industry.
 Dorabji Tata (27 August 1859 – 3 June 1932), elder son of Jamshedji, Indian industrialist, philanthropist and 2nd Chairman of Tata Group. His wife, Meherbai Tata, was the paternal aunt of nuclear scientist Homi J. Bhabha.
 Ratanji Tata (20 January 1871 – 5 September 1918), younger son of Jamshedji, philanthropist and pioneer of poverty studies. After Ratanji Tata died, his wife, Navajbai Tata, adopted an orphan, Naval, who was the grand-nephew of her mother-in-law, and raised him as her own son.
 Naval Tata, (30 August 1904 – 5 May 1989) adopted son of Navajbai Tata. His biological maternal grandmother had been the sister of Hirabai Tata, wife of group founder Jamshedji Tata. Also, his biological father, Hormusji Tata, had belonged to the broader Tata family, and Naval therefore carried the surname "Tata" by birthright. Director in several Tata companies, ILO member, recipient of Padma Bhushan. He married twice and had three sons.
 Simone Naval Tata, second wife of Naval Tata, a Swiss woman and a Catholic. She ran Lakme and served as chairperson of Trent.
 Ratan Tata, 5th Chairman of the Tata Group, son of Naval Tata by his first wife Sooni Commissariat.
 Jimmy Tata, son of Naval Tata by his first wife Sooni Commissariat.
 Noel Tata, chairperson of Trent, son of Naval Tata by his second wife Simone.
 Ratanji Dadabhoy Tata (1856–1926), one of the early stalwarts to serve the Tata Group. His father Dadabhoy and Jeevanbai - mother of Jamshedji Tata, were siblings. Ratanji was also a paternal cousin of Jamshedji and belonged to the broader Tata family. He married Suzanne Brière, a French Catholic, and had five children, including:
 J. R. D. Tata (29 July 1904 – 29 November 1993), son of Ratanji Tata by his wife Suzanne. As 4th Chairman of Tata Group, he pioneered Indian aviation and founded Tata Airlines (later known as Air India).
 Sylla Tata, daughter of Ratanji Dadabhoy and elder sister of J.R.D. She was married to Sir Dinshaw Maneckji Petit, 3rd Baronet.

References

Bibliography
  At Tata Central Archives.

External links 
 Tata family tree, Economic times
 The most successful Tata Viral Panda

 
Gujarati people
Parsi people from Mumbai
Business families of India